The 1898 San Jose State Spartans football team represented State Teachers College at San Jose during the 1898 college football season.  In their first and only year under head coach Thad McKay, the Spartans compiled their first undefeated record at 5–0–1, and outscored their opponents by a total of 80 to 17.  Many other milestones characterized the 1898 season, including the program's first shutout, and intercollegiate win (18 to 0 against College of the Pacific, also their first win overall), and their first season in which they participated in multiple games.

Schedule

References

San Jose State
San Jose State Spartans football seasons
College football undefeated seasons
San Jose State Spartans football